Lee Kohler (born June 22, 1961) is an American pianist, composer, and vocalist, best known as being the leader of the band This World.

Early life and education
Kohler was raised in Great Falls, Montana, United States, along with his siblings Rob, Kate, and Ken Kohler. His father, John Kohler, was a music educator and saxophonist, and his mother Marjorie is a church organist. Kohler attended Montana State University in Bozeman, studying piano with Leslie Jones and Henry Campbell. Kohler toured the United States in 1980 with the band Phoenix Express, then known as Nova. The band opened for acts such as Rita Coolidge, Three Dog Night, and Gary Puckett & The Union Gap.

In Flight (1983-90)
In 1983, Kohler founded the band In Flight with guitarist Robi Johns. Kohler's brother Rob joined the band in 1985. The group then consisted of Lee Kohler on keyboards, Rob Kohler on bass, and Robi Johns on guitar. The group composed all of their own music, which was a mix of classical, jazz, and new age styles. They travelled to Seattle in 1986 to record their first album at the Music Source, where Nirvana would later record parts of "Smells Like Teen Spirit" in 1991. The album, entitled "...Imagine a Music" was self-released on cassette. After increasing press attention and critical acclaim, the trio was invited to perform at the Montreux Jazz Festival in 1989. They performed three times at the festival in July 1989, for audiences of more than 70,000 each. The group disbanded in 1990.

Return as This World (1995-present)
In 1995, Lee and Rob Kohler formed another trio with drummer Michael Blessing, called This World. The band saw Lee Kohler shift from acoustic piano to a focus on synthesizers and singing, and the addition of percussion added a new dimension to the new band's sound. The group recorded an eponymous album with veteran producer Cookie Marenco during the summer of 1995. After Blessing left the group, he was replaced by drummer Clay Green, who appears on the band's second album Beyond the Beyond. After 13 years, the band reformed again with drummer Mark Raynes to record their third album, Celestial Skies.

Musical style
Kohler's compositional style is heavily influenced by Yes, Pink Floyd, and traditional church organ music. His lyrics are often calls for peace and spiritual harmony. Kohler explained in an interview with the Vacaville Reporter that he is "not very interested in what's going on politically, but humanitarianly. What inspires me are mostly world events, and human tragedy."

Personal life
Kohler married Maria Kohler in 1991. The couple has three children; Patricia (b. 1980), Matthew (b. 1990), and Anna (b. 1991). They currently reside in Fairfield, California where Kohler works as a church organist.

Discography

with This World
...Imagine a Music (1986, as In Flight)
This World (1996)
Beyond the Beyond (2000)
Celestial Skies (2013)

Solo
Organ Works I (2000)
Organ Works III (2006)
Organ Works IV (2009)
Piano Works (2014)

with Kohler Jazz Trio
Blues and Things (1996)

As sideman
Harmony and Bells (2007, with the Kohler Green Project)

References

1961 births
Living people
American male composers
American male pianists
American male singers
People from Great Falls, Montana
Musicians from Montana